The results of elections to the Labour Party's Shadow Cabinet (more formally, its "Parliamentary Committee") were announced on 30 October 1985. In addition to the 15 members elected, the Leader (Neil Kinnock), Deputy Leader (Roy Hattersley), Labour Chief Whip (Derek Foster), Labour Leader in the House of Lords (Cledwyn Hughes), and Chairman of the Parliamentary Labour Party (Jack Dormand) were automatically members.

As a result of the election, Gwyneth Dunwoody lost her place in the cabinet.  Hughes and Dobson tied for 15th place, so a run-off election was conducted, in which Hughes beat Dobson by 102 votes to 75.

Footnotes
Notes

References

1985
Labour Party Shadow Cabinet election
Labour Party (UK) Shadow Cabinet election